Rendufe is a parish in Amares Municipality in the Braga District in Portugal. The population in 2011 was 1,124, in an area of 3.06 km².

References

Freguesias of Amares